Mister Antonio is a 1929 love story based on a 1916 Booth Tarkington Broadway play of the same name. Leo Carrillo stars in the title role of Antonio Camaradino, originated on Broadway by Otis Skinner, as a hurdy-gurdy street artist who falls in love with the relative of a robbery victim he has rescued.

Print preserved in the Library of Congress collection.

Cast
Leo Carrillo – Antonio Camaradino  
Virginia Valli – June Ramsey
Gareth Hughes – Joe
Frank Reicher – Milton Jorny 
Eugenie Besserer – Mrs. Jorny

References

External links
 
 
 
 
  Mister Antonio available for free download at Archive.org
 "Mister Antonio" at the Free-Classic-Movies website

1929 films
American black-and-white films
1920s English-language films
Films based on works by Booth Tarkington
Films directed by James Flood
1929 romantic comedy films
Tiffany Pictures films
American romantic comedy films
1920s American films